At the 2000 Summer Olympics in Sydney, 46 events in athletics were contested, 24 for men and 22 for women. There were a total number of 2,134 participating athletes from 193 countries.

Medal table

Participating nations
A total of 193 nations participated in the different athletics events at the 2000 Summer Olympics. Two athletes from East Timor participated as individual Olympic athletes. A total of 2135 athletes competed at the competition.

Medal summary

Men

* Athletes who participated in the heats only and received medals.

Women

* Athletes who participated in the heats only and received medals.

See also
Athletics at the 2000 Summer Olympics – Qualification
Athletics at the 2000 Summer Paralympics
2000 in athletics (track and field)

References

External links
 Athletics Australia
 IAAF

 
2000 Summer Olympics events
2000
Olympics